Roni F. Zeiger is an American physician and technologist. He is notable for his work as the Chief Health Strategist (2006–2012) at Google where he developed Google Health and Google Flu Trends. He is a co-founder of the Smart Patients project. In 2019, Zeiger announced he would be joining Facebook as the Head of Health Strategy.

Education
Zeiger received his medical degree at Stanford University, including a master's degree in biomedical informatics and he did his residency at University of California, San Francisco (UCSF). He was an internist by training. He became interesting in the application of technology in healthcare during his medical training, and noticing how difficult it was to find things in the medical records and how as time went on, the records got larger and more difficult to navigate.

Work
Zeiger did primary care for some time. Zeiger has been profiled for partnering tech companies to health efforts.

Google 

Zeiger was Chief Health Strategist (2006–2012) at Google where he worked on Google Health, symptom, anatomy, and health search on Google Search, and Google Flu Trends.

Smart Patients
With Gilles Frydman, founder of the Association of Cancer Online Resources, Zeiger co-founded the Smart Patients project. The project is a search engine and social media platform which connects clinical trial participants in cancer studies to each other for personal conversations.

Bibliography
This is a select list of some of Zeiger's writings.

References

External links
 personal homepage
Smart Patients official website
Video: Who is the real medical expert?, TEDMED Talks from TEDMED 2013 conference (April 2013)
Radio: A Chat with Roni Zeiger, MD CEO 'Smart Patients', (April 2013) from This Week in Health Innovation

Living people
American public health doctors
Google people
Stanford University School of Medicine alumni
Year of birth missing (living people)